James Grehan is an Australian singer and songwriter. Grehan has released four studio albums. He has performed at Woodford Folk Festival, Big Day Out and Valley Fiesta.

Grehan describes his music as "Smooth progressive folk, lightly salted with a garnish of electronic textures, easy to swallow with a pleasurable palate."

Early life and career
In 2003, Grehan released his debut album, Rather Be a Butterfly which was described as a combination of "contemporary electronica with acoustic sounds".

In 2004, Grehan won Best Acoustic Artist at the 2004 Music Oz Awards. In 2005, Grehan's released his second album Chemical Sunsets which was proceeded by the single, "Code Red".

In 2008, Grehan was nominated for five awards at the Q Song Awards, winning three.

In 2011, Grehan release Paper Parallels, which featured "Falling" which won two awards at the 2010 Q Song Awards, making James the most awarded Q Song winner in the history of the awards.

Discography

Studio albums

Extended plays

Awards and nominations

APRA Music Awards
The APRA Awards are held in Australia and New Zealand by the Australasian Performing Right Association to recognise songwriting skills, sales and airplay performance by its members annually.

|-
| 2010
| "Hold On"
| Blues and Roots Work of the Year
| 
|-
|}

Q Song Awards
The Queensland Music Awards (previously known as Q Song Awards) are annual awards celebrating Queensland, Australia's brightest emerging artists and established legends. They commenced in 2006.

 (wins only)
|-
| rowspan="3"| 2008
| rowspan="3"| "Til You Come Home"
| Alternative Song of the Year 
| 
|-
| Regional Song of the Year 
| 
|-
| The Courier-Mail People's Choice Award  
| 
|-
| rowspan="2"| 2010
| rowspan="2"| "Falling"
| Alternative Song of the Year 
| 
|-
| Regional Song of the Year 
| 
|-

References

Australian male singers
Living people
Australian male guitarists
People from Queensland
Year of birth missing (living people)